Karan Vohra is an Indian television actor. He made his acting debut with Zindagi Ki Mehek in 2016, portraying Shaurya Khanna and Shaurya Singh Ahlawat. Since September 2022, he is seen portraying  Atharva Rana in Imlie.

Early and personal life
Vohra was born and brought up in Delhi. He has two siblings named Kunal Vohra and Komal Vohra. His sister Komal, is the ex-wife of rapper Raftaar.

Vohra is married to Bella Vohra since 2012.

Career
Vohra made his acting debut with Zindagi Ki Mehek, portraying Shaurya Khanna from 2016 to 2018 and Shaurya Ahlawat in 2018 opposite Samiksha Jaiswal.

From 2018 to 2019, he portrayed Dr. Veer Sahay in Krishna Chali London opposite Megha Chakraborty.

In 2021, he portrayed ACP Raghav Shastri in Pinjara Khubsurti Ka.

Since September 2022, he is seen portraying Atharva Rana in Imlie opposite Chakraborty and Seerat Kapoor.

Television

Awards and nominations

References

External links

Year of birth missing (living people)
Living people
Indian male television actors
21st-century Indian male actors